Karl Magnus Torlén (born 25 September 1985) is a Swedish sailor competing for GKSS. He finished 18th in the 2008 Summer Olympics in the 49er class together with Jonas Lindberg.

Karl Torlén was born in Nacka, Sweden on 25 September 1985.

References

Swedish male sailors (sport)
Olympic sailors of Sweden
Sailors at the 2008 Summer Olympics – 49er
1985 births
Living people
Royal Gothenburg Yacht Club sailors
Artemis Racing sailors
2017 America's Cup sailors